Cyrtidiorchis is a genus of flowering plants from the orchid family, Orchidaceae. It contains 5 known species, all native to South America.

Species
Species include:

Cyrtidiorchis alata (Ruiz & Pav.) Rauschert - Ecuador, Peru
Cyrtidiorchis frontinoensis (Garay) Rauschert - Colombia
Cyrtidiorchis gerardi P.Ortiz - Colombia
Cyrtidiorchis rhomboglossa (F.Lehm. & Kraenzl.) Rauschert  - Ecuador, Colombia, Venezuela
Cyrtidiorchis stumpflei (Garay) Rauschert - Peru

See also
 List of Orchidaceae genera

References

 Pridgeon, A.M., Cribb, P.J., Chase, M.A. & Rasmussen, F. eds. (1999). Genera Orchidacearum 1. Oxford Univ. Press.
 Pridgeon, A.M., Cribb, P.J., Chase, M.A. & Rasmussen, F. eds. (2001). Genera Orchidacearum 2. Oxford Univ. Press.
 Pridgeon, A.M., Cribb, P.J., Chase, M.A. & Rasmussen, F. eds. (2003). Genera Orchidacearum 3. Oxford Univ. Press
 Berg Pana, H. 2005. Handbuch der Orchideen-Namen. Dictionary of Orchid Names. Dizionario dei nomi delle orchidee. Ulmer, Stuttgart

External links

Orchids of South America
Maxillariinae genera
Maxillariinae